The Price of Silence is a song written to celebrate the 60th anniversary of the signing of the Universal Declaration of Human Rights featuring a number of well-known world musicians. The song was produced by Andres Levin (Music Has No Enemies) in coordination with Link TV: Television Without Borders. The net proceeds from the sale of the song will go to fund Amnesty International.

Origin

To commemorate the 60th anniversary of the Universal Declaration on Human Rights and to draw attention to violations of human rights around the world, Link TV partnered with  Andres Levin (Music Has No Enemies) and a number of musicians, cameramen, and producers to create the song and music video. The net revenue made from sales of the song are designated to go to fund Amnesty International. The music of "The Price of Silence" is based on Aterciopelados' song "Cancion Protesta" from their album Oye.

Artists

Artists who worked on the song came from all over the world and included the following.

In addition to the above musicians, there were a number of other musicians who wanted to be involved but ultimately could not, because of the risk associated with a human rights message. Steven Lawrence, Link TV's vice president for music and cultural programming, said, “We contacted artists who had the will, but ultimately couldn’t get involved because they or their families would have been in danger. In one case, we couldn’t even directly mention the project in our emails to a certain Central Asian musician because of government surveillance. We had to communicate in code.”

Song Production

Emmanuel Jal of Sudan, a former child soldier, was the first artist to record, a day after he spoke to the U.N. General Assembly. Following him, the other musicians recorded their parts, including Lhamo's Buddhist prayer for peace and Chiwoniso's "shout for freedom" in Shona. Other artists sang in Arabic, Urdu, Yoruban, and Spanish.

Music video

The video is set in the United Nations General Assembly room and directed by Joshua Atesh Litle. For filming, the UN allowed the cameramen special access in order to film the video. Sixty actors played UN delegates, changing their wardrobes five times. The various musicians were filmed at other locations and digitally composited into the front of the room by The Syndicate and Phoenix Editorial Designs. Scenes for the video were filmed in parts of Bogota, Paris, London, Miami, Los Angeles, and South Africa.

The music video opens with Laurence Fishburne reciting a prologue written by Alicia Partnoy for the movie. The movie then shows the musicians singing in front of the United Nations.

Steven Lawrence said that filming took longer than three months.

Release

The EP, including the song "The Price of Silence", was released on December 9, 2008 for download only on iTunes, the day before the anniversary of the Universal Declaration of Human Rights. The EP sold for 99 cents a song or $1.99 for the full track, and featured the original song, a radio edit, a Spanish version of the song, and the original “Canción Protesta” by Aterciopelados.

The accompanying music video was played regularly on Link TV beginning the same day.

References

2008 EPs
Charity albums
All-star recordings
Works about the United Nations